Ronald Dekker (also spelled Decker, born 30 June 1966 in Deventer, Overijssel, Netherlands) is a former breaststroke swimmer from Netherlands. He was a specialist on short course, and won the silver medal in 100m at the 1993 FINA Short Course World Championships in Palma de Mallorca. He swam individual 100m and 200m breaststroke and 4 × 100 m medley and freestyle relays at the 1988 Summer Olympics with the best achievement of 7th place in the relay.

References

1966 births
Living people
Dutch male freestyle swimmers
Dutch male breaststroke swimmers
Dutch male medley swimmers
Olympic swimmers of the Netherlands
Sportspeople from Deventer
Swimmers at the 1988 Summer Olympics
Medalists at the FINA World Swimming Championships (25 m)